Gasabo is a district (akarere) in Kigali city, the capital of Rwanda. The headquarter of Gasabo is located in Remera Sector. The district also includes large areas of the city itself, including Kacyiru, Kimironko, Remera, Nyarutarama and Kimihurura.

The district is the location of the Gisozi Genocide Memorial Site, the burial place of approximately 300,000 victims of the 1994 Genocide against Tutsis . In addition to the cemetery, the memorial has a related genocide exhibition area and library and has plans to develop a teaching centre on the history of the genocide.

History 

The original country of Rwanda, referred to as "the Rwanda of Gasabo" (u Rwanda rwa Gasabo), was a small territorial entity located in the present district of Gasabo, along the valley of Lake Muhazi, namely Nyabugogo. When the period of historical kings unfolded ("abami b’ibitekerezo"), Rwanda came under the reign of King Ruganzu Bwimba- The first king among series of historical kings who ruled from the fourteenth to the twentieth centuries. The kingdom of Rwanda was governed by kings (abami)

During the Habyarimana government, the Gasabo District was called Gikomero commune. It was divided into ten sectors: Bumbogo, Gasabo, Gicaca, Gikomero, Gishaka, Kayanga, Nduba, Rutunga, Sha and Shango.

Geography 
The district occupies the northern half of Kigali province, which had its boundaries extended under local government reorganisation in 2006. Gasabo includes major suburbs of Kigali, sections of a ring of hills which surround the city, and some villages to the north and east of those. Rwanda's wealthiest area, Nyarutarama is also in the district, as are the office of the president (in Kacyiru) and most of the ministries.

The district contains the following sectors: Bumbogo, Gatsata, Gikomero, Gisozi, Jabana, Jali, Kacyiru, Kimihurura, Kimironko, Kinyinya, Ndera, Nduba, Remera, Rusororo, Rutunga.

Population 

Basing to the results of the fourth population and housing census (2012) it indicated that Gasabo district has a population of 529,561 representing 46.8% among them male represent 51.7% and female 48.3% of the total population for Kigali City (1,132,686 population) and 5% of the total national population (10,515,973). This population is distributed into urban and rural area represented by 69% and 31% respectively. The average age of population is 25.5 years. According to EICV 5 (2017), 73.7% of  households headed by males and 22.1% of households headed by females in Gasabo district whereas at national level 68.6% of households headed by males and  25% of households headed by females.

{| class=wikitable style="margin: 1em 1em 0 0; border-collapse: collapse; font-size: 100%;" align="right"
|-bgcolor="#35682D" style="color:black"
! colspan="3" style="text-align:center; color:white; background:#2E8B57;"| Sectors of the Gasabo District by population according to the 2022 census 
|-
! N°
! Sectors of  Gasabo District
! 
|- align="center" style="background:#efefef; color:black 
! 1°| align="left"|
| align="right"|112,899
|- align="center" 
! 2°| align="left"|
| align="right"|125,400
|- align="center" style="background:#efefef; color:black 
! 3°| align="left"|
| align="right"|95,164
|- align="center"
! 4°| align="left"|
| align="right"|75,611
|- align="center" style="background:#efefef; color:black 
! 5°| align="left"|
| align="right"|68,424
|- align="center"
! 6°| align="left"|
| align="right"|63,862
|- align="center" style="background:#efefef; color:black 
! 7°| align="left"|
| align="right"|61,787
|- align="center"
! 8°| align="left"|
| align="right"|61,733
|- align="center" style="background:#efefef; color:black 
! 9°| align="left"|
| align="right"|46,262
|- align="center"
! 10°| align="left"|
| align="right"|41,156
|- align="center" style="background:#efefef; color:black 
! 11°| align="left"|
| align="right"|38,648
|- align="center"
! 12°| align="left"|
| align="right"|30,036
|- align="center" style="background:#efefef; color:black 
! 13°| align="left"|
| align="right"|22,468
|- align="center"
! 14°| align="left"|
| align="right"|19,630
|- align="center" style="background:#efefef; color:black 
! 15°| align="left"|
| align="right"|16,425
|- align="center" bgcolor=#D0E7FF
! Total| align="left"|Gasabo District 
| align="right"|879,505'|}

 Topography and climate 
This district is characterized by the mixture of high mountains with average altitude of  mainly located in the rural zone, sloping basins and valleys. It has over 30 wetlands and small rivers traversing through the valleys. Also, Lake Muhanzi in the north and part in the east borders Gasabo district.  Similarly, other water sources of importance are: Rusumo River in Rugende which ends in Akagera River, Buliza River that traverses through Karuruma, Umulindi and Rusine centers before empting into Nyabugogo River. These marshlands or wetlands provide potentialities to the district if well reclaimed can enhance or increase agriculture productivity, improve tourism, improve environmental ecological system as well.

It has two main climatic seasons in a year, which are, the dry and rain seasons. The two major climatic seasons alternate within the year, hence, the District experiencing two dry seasons and rain seasons as defined below.

 Administratives boundaries 

Gasabo is in the North East of Kigali City and bordered by Kicukiro district (south), Nyarugenge (west south), Rwamagana (east south), Rulindo (north west) and Gicumbi (north east).

 Education 

Education is the primary agent of transformation towards sustainable development. It increases people's capacities to transform their visions for society into reality. All countries strive for quality education for their sustainable development. In Africa, especially in our country Rwanda, education is considered as a fundamental human right and an essential means to ensure that all Rwandans realize their full potentials. It places special emphasis on basic education as a priority area within the Poverty Reduction Strategy Papers (PRSP) because of the strong correlation between education and improved economic opportunities, better life and fewer children (family planning), especially for girls. [Ministry of Finance and Economic Planning (MINECOFIN), 2005:40].

However, in Gasabo district- the indicators such as gross primary enrolment rate (139.9%) and gross secondary enrolment rate (66.1%) positions the district below the national rates of 148.4% (gross primary enrollment) and above the 40.9% national rate in gross secondary school enrolment. Also in terms of literacy levels- the district's literacy levels persons of 15 years and older in the district is above the national average rate of 69.7% at 84.8%, though, slightly below rates registered in Kicukiro and Nyarugenge at 89.5% and 86.7%. Though, the district level is below the country's target of 90% and 100%as stipulated in the 7YGP and Vision 2020 respectively. The same survey revealed that the computer literacy rate for persons of 15+ years stands at 17.4%. The district recognizes the need to improve the literacy rates to boost up ICT innovations and private sector led economy. According to the administrative data, the girl/boy attendance at primary level is equally balanced at 50% unlike the imbalance observed at high level

In terms of student/classroom ratio in primary level is at 35.9 below the standard of 46 pupils per classroom while pupil/qualified teacher ratio is 54. It is also observed that the district has unqualified, for example, in private, private aided and public primary schools are 5%, 4% and 8% respectively. Usage of computers and internet in primary schools is 4,641 computers and 28 schools have access to internet.

Infrastructures located at Gasabo District 
Gasabo District is set to upgrade and renovate the district infrastructure in line with the Kigali City Master Plan such as schools, Roads, King Faysal Hospital , Housing, Churches, Touristic zones, Memorial centers, Markets,  Amahoro Stadium, Kigali Arena , Kigali Convention Center, different Ministries,...

 Roads 
This follows the signing of a memorandum of understanding between the district and Horizon Construction Company Ltd to facilitate the upgrading, construction and renovation of roads in the district

Amahoro National Stadium
Amahoro Stadium is the biggest one in Rwanda and oldest. The ministry of sports plans to be able to host a large number of people. And Kigali ARENA the stadium that can host basketball, volleyball and shows have the capacity of 10,000 people seated.

 Notable persons 
André Rwamakuba, accused war criminal
Eugene Mussolini, member of the Chamber of Deputies and former member of the Gasabo District council

See also
Kigali Innovation City
Kigali Convention Center

 References 

 External links 
 
 Inzego.doc — Province, District and Sector information from MINALOC'', the Rwanda ministry of local government.

 
Kigali Province
Districts of Rwanda